Prostitution, as defined under modern Japanese law, is the illegal practice of sexual intercourse with an 'unspecified' (unacquainted) person in exchange for monetary compensation, which was criminalised in 1956 by the introduction of article 3 of the .

Following the criminalisation of payment for sexual intercourse, the sex industry in Japan has developed into a number of varied businesses and offering services not prohibited under Japanese law. These fall into a number of categories known by various euphemistic names, such as soaplands, fashion health shops, and pink salons, with the term "health" commonly being a euphemism for sexual services. These businesses typically operate out of physical premises, either with their own employees or freelancers such as call girls, who may operate via Internet dating sites known as  sites (Internet dating sites) or via delivery health services.

Fashion health
, also known as "fashion massage", is a form of massage parlor which circumvents Japanese laws by offering a range of services that stop short of sexual intercourse. Fashion health clubs are typically found in most of Japan's larger cities, operating out of physical premises decorated with bright flashing lights and generally bright and garish decor. They commonly post pictures of their "masseuse" employees near the entrance, though the face and eyes may be censored with pixellation or black strips; some club entrances feature caricatured depictions of the services provided. It was especially famous by that name in the 1980s.

Delivery health
Delivery health businesses do not typically operate out of physical premises, instead employing freelancers, and advertise through handouts sent to mailboxes, posters in telephone booths, public toilets and similar places, usually in large cities within Japan; advertising is also conducted through a number of websites online.

Image club

Sex workers employed at image clubs, whose activities are usually limited to oral sex, wear exaggerated costumes appropriate to the setting and the desire of the customer. Image clubs simulating molestation of female train passengers became popular in the wake of stricter enforcement of laws against groping on trains.

Image clubs may offer itemized pricing for particular services, such as taking instant photographs, removing a woman's underwear or taking it home. Women working at image clubs are paid around 30,000 to 35,000 yen per day, and may make more than 1 million yen per month.

Pink salon

Pink salons avoid criminalisation under Japanese law by serving food, operating without showers or private rooms, and limiting the services provided to fellatio. Pink salons are found across Japan, and workers commonly see a dozen or more customers per shift.

Soapland

The term is a "Japanlish" term, constructed from the two English words soap and land.

Soaplands exploit a loophole in Japanese law, wherein compensated sexual intercourse may be conducted between 'specified' (acquainted) persons. In his book  (Control of Sex Business Operations), Kansai University professor Yoshikazu Nagai documented the practice of soapland businesses, wherein customers pay an entry fee to 'use the bathing facilities', and a separate fee for a massage. Whilst the massage takes place, the masseuse and the customer become 'acquainted', resulting in any paid sexual services following this as not being viewed as prostitution as defined by the law, an interpretation that has been utilised since the 1960s. However, some soaplands have, in previous decades, been prosecuted for violating the Anti-Prostitution Law, having been deemed to be places of prostitution, resulting in the cessation of these businesses.

A number of different types of soapland exist, typically located in complexes with varying numbers of soaplands. Well-known complexes can be found in Susukino in Sapporo, Yoshiwara and Kabukicho in Tokyo, Kawasaki, Kanazuen in Gifu, Ogoto in Shiga, Fukuhara in Kobe, Sagaminumata in Odawara, and Nakasu in Fukuoka. A number of other areas, especially in  towns, also feature soaplands. Although the main clientele for soaplands are men, there are also a few soaplands specifically for female clients. Prices for a session at a soapland vary depending on location, time of day, rank of provider, and length of the session.

It is a form of genital-genital rubbing performed by a female sex worker upon a male client. The sex worker rubs the client's penis with her thighs (intercrural sex) and labia majora. The goal is to stimulate ejaculation without penile vaginal penetration, an activity circumventing the Anti-Prostitution Law.

See also
 Prostitution in Japan
 Nuru (massage)

References

Further reading 
 
 Bornoff, Nicholas, Pink Samurai: Love, Marriage, and Sex in Contemporary Japan, New York: Pocket Books, 1991, 
 Enz, Lorenzo Enzo. "Pink Salons in Tokyo Japan." My Sexpedition. N.p., 19 Dec. 2014. Web. 30 July 2017.
 
 Hosoda, Naomi Bakan. The International Division of Labour and the Commodification of Female Sexuality: The Case of Filipino Women in the Japanese Entertainment Industry. Dissertation, Ottawa, Ontario. ProQuest Dissertations Publishing, 1994. Web. 21 July 2017.
 
 Rubin, Samantha. Jon Inc.: The Making of Japan's Salaried Men into Clients of High School Prostitutes. Dissertation, Rep. Alberta. ProQuest Dissertations, 2002. 20th Century Drama [ProQuest]. Web. 21 July 2017.
 
 Schreiber, Mark. "In the Pink." The Japan Times. The Japan Times, 8 July 2001. Web. 30 July 2017.
 Talmadge, Eric, Getting Wet: Adventures in the Japanese Bath, Tokyo: Kodansha International, 2006, Chapter 9: "Dirty Waters", pp. 180–98, 

Prostitution in Japan
Sexuality in Japan
Society of Japan